The following is a timeline of the history of the city of Rabat, Morocco.

Prior to 20th century

 1150 CE - Citadel construction begins.
 1627 - Rabat and Salé form the Republic of Bou Regreg.
 1864 - Dar al-Makhzen (palace) built.

20th century

 1912 - Moroccan capital relocated to Rabat from Fes.
 1915 - Musée National des Bijoux à Rabat active.
 1916 - Lycée Moulay Youssef (school) opens.
 1919 - Stade Marocain football club formed.
 1923 - Stade de FUS (stadium) opens.
 1924 - Bibliothèque Nationale du Royaume du Maroc established.
 1944 -  headquartered in Rabat.
 1946 - Fath Union Sport football club formed.
 1951 - Population: 156,209.
 1955 - Rabat becomes capital of independent Morocco.
 1957 -  opens.
 1958 - Association Sportive des Forces Armées Royales football club formed.
 1959 - Maghreb Arabe Press established.
 1960 - Population: 233,000.
 1961 - National Institute of Statistics and Applied Economics established.
 1962 -  opens.
 1967 - Association Marocaine de la Recherche et de l'Echange Culturel established.
 1969 - Organisation of Islamic Cooperation founded in Rabat.
 1973 - Population: 435,510 city; 596,600 urban agglomeration.
 1974 - 1974 Arab League summit held.
 1979 - Islamic Educational, Scientific and Cultural Organization headquartered in city.
 1980
  (school) established.
 Population: 808,000.
 1981 - National Institute for Urban and Territorial Planning headquartered in Rabat.
 1982 - Meeting of the Association Internationale des Maires Francophones held in city.
 1983 - Prince Moulay Abdellah Stadium opens.
 1985 - August: 1985 Pan Arab Games held.
 1987 - Universite Mohammed V's Centre D'etudes Strategiques established.
 1989
 1989 Jeux de la Francophonie held in Rabat.
 Arab Maghreb Union headquartered in Rabat.
 1991 - Casablanca–Rabat expressway built.
 1993 - Population: 1,220,000 urban agglomeration (estimate).
 1999 - Rabat–Fes expressway built.
 2000 - Population: 1,507,000.

21st century

 2005 - Rabat–Tangier expressway built.
 2009 - Fathallah Oualalou becomes mayor.
 2010
 Rabat Ringroad construction begins.
 June–July: African Youth Games held in Rabat
 2011
 February: Political demonstration.
 Rabat-Salé tramway begins operating.
 Population: 1,843,000.
 2012 - Rabat–Salé Airport new terminal opens.
 2013 - Archives du Maroc opens.
 2014 - Population: 578,644 (estimate).
 2015 - City becomes part of the Rabat-Salé-Kénitra administrative region.

See also
 Rabat history
 Timelines of other cities in Morocco: Casablanca, Fez, Marrakesh, Meknes, Tangier

References

This article incorporates information from the French Wikipedia.

Bibliography

in English
 
 
 

in French
 
  
  
   (About  quarter)

External links

  (Images, etc.)
  (Images, etc.)
  (Images, etc.)
  (Bibliography)
  (Bibliography)
  (Bibliography)
  (Bibliography of open access  articles)

Images

Rabat
Rabat
Rabat